Lefties Soul Connection are a Dutch funk band from Amsterdam.

The band was formed by guitarist Onno Smit and organist Alviz in August 2001, with Cody Vogel joining on drums by the end of the year. Bram Bosman joined as full-time bassist early in 2002, as the group solidified a mostly instrumental sound influenced by The Meters and Booker T & the MGs. They began releasing 45rpm singles on Melting Pot Music, including a cover version of DJ Shadow's "Organ Donor". Their debut full-length, Hutspot, arrived in 2006, with a follow-up, Skimming the Skum, released in 2007. The group toured with Hind Laroussi in 2009.

Members
Current
Onno Smit - guitar
Alviz - Hammond organ
Pieter Bakker - bass
Cody Vogel - drums

Former
Bram Bosman - bass (2002–2008)

Discography
LP:
Dutch Soul Food, (2004)
Hutspot (Excelsior Recordings, 2006)
Skimming the Skum (Excelsior Recordings, 2007)
One Punch Pete (TopNotch, 2011)

References
Notes

Further Reading
Hind met Lefties Soul Connection op stap. Brabants Dagblad, February 18, 2009.
Lefties Soul Connection speelt de regen net niet weg. De Gelderlander, July 18, 2008.
Soul en Funk met de Lefties Soul Connection. Het Nieuwsblad, November 23, 2007.
Uitstapje naar funk en soul. AD.nl, April 8, 2009.

Dutch funk musical groups